Sold at Auction is a 1917 American silent drama film directed by Sherwood MacDonald and starring Lois Meredith, William Conklin, and Marguerite Nichols.

Cast
 Lois Meredith as Nan 
 William Conklin as Richard Stanley 
 Marguerite Nichols as Helen 
 Frank Mayo as Hal Norris 
 Charles Dudley as William Raynor 
 Lucy Blake as Raynor's Sister

Censorship
The film industry created the National Association of the Motion Picture Industry in 1916 in an effort to preempt censorship by states and municipalities, and it used a list of subjects called the "Thirteen Points" which film plots were to avoid. Sold at Auction, with its white slavery plot line, is an example of a film that clearly violated the Thirteen Points and yet was still distributed. Since the NAMPI was ineffective, it was replaced in 1922.

Preservation
With no copies of Sold at Auction listed in any film archive, it is a lost film

References

Bibliography
 Langman, Larry. American Film Cycles: The Silent Era. Greenwood Publishing, 1998.

External links

1917 films
1917 drama films
Silent American drama films
Films directed by Sherwood MacDonald
American silent feature films
1910s English-language films
Pathé Exchange films
American black-and-white films
1910s American films